The (Greater) Mamean family is a branch of the Eastern Mayan language group.

Languages
Mamean proper: Mam (478,000 speakers), Tektiteko (5,000 speakers)
Ixilan: Ixil (135,000 speakers), Awakatek (11,607 speakers)

Phonology

Vowels

Consonants

See Mayan languages#Mamean for details.

References

Mayan languages